Live in London may refer to:

Live in London, an album by Amon Düül II, 1973
Live in London (Andraé Crouch album), 1978
Live in London (April Wine video), 1981
Live in London (Beach Boys album), 1970
Live in London (Brand New Heavies album), 2009
Live in London, an EP by Bridgit Mendler, 2013
Live in London (Deep Purple album), 1982
Live in London, an album by the Dickies, 2002
Live in London (Flight of the Conchords album), 2018
Live in London (The Gaslight Anthem video), 2013
Live in London (Gene Harris album), 2008
Live in London (George Michael video), 2009
Live in London, by Great White, 1990
Live in London (Helen Reddy album), 1978
Live in London (Hyperbubble album), 2015
Live in London, a video (2006) and album (2008) by Iona
Live in London (Il Divo), 2011
Live in London, an album by John Holt, 1984
Live in London, an album by John Illsley
Live in London (Johnny Diesel and the Injectors EP), 1989
Live in London (Judas Priest album), 2003
Live in London (Judas Priest video), 2002
Live in London (Judith Durham album), 2014
Live in London (The Only Ones album), 1989
Live in London, an album by Kelis, 2014
Live in London (Leonard Cohen album), 2009
Live in London (Mavis Staples album), 2019
Live in London (Michel Camilo album), 2017
Live in London (Natalie Imbruglia EP), 2007
Live in London (Peggy Lee album), 1977
Live in London (R5 EP), 2014
Live in London (Regina Spektor album), 2010
Live in London (Ricky Skaggs album), 1985
Live in London, an album by Scott Matthews, 2010
Live in London (Sheer Greed album), 1993
Live in London (Steppenwolf album), 1981
Live in London (Testament album), 2005
Live in London, by the Toasters, 1998
Live in London (Will Young video), 2005
Live in London (Zeal & Ardor album), 2019
Live in London: Babymetal World Tour 2014, a video album, 2015
Live in London 1980, an album by the Fall, 1982
Live in London 1986, an album by Suzanne Vega, 1986
Live in London 2011, by Miyavi, 2011
Live in London March 2011, an album by KT Tunstall
Hannah Montana: Live in London, a concert, 2007
I Told You I Was Trouble: Live in London, a video (2007) and album (2015) by Amy Winehouse
Ride a White Horse: Live in London E.P., by Goldfrapp, 2006

See also
Live in London & New York, an album by Corinne Bailey Rae, 2007
Live in London Town, a video by William Control, 2013
London Live (disambiguation)